Khasas (Devanāgarī: खश) were an ancient Indo-Aryan tribe and a late Janapada kingdom from Himalayan regions of northern Indian subcontinent mentioned in the various historical Indian inscriptions and ancient Indian Hindu and Tibetan literatures. European sources described the Khasa tribe living in the Northwest Himalayas and the Roman geographer Pliny The Elder specifically described them as "Indian people". They were reported to have lived around Gandhara, Trigarta and Madra Kingdom as per the Mahabharata. 

People of this tribe includes Khas people of medieval Western Nepal, medieval Indian regions of Garhwal and Kumaon, the Kanets of Kangra, Himachal and Garhwal, the Khasa of Jaunsar-Bawar as well as Khakha Rajputs and Bomba clans of Kashmir and different part of northern Pakistan.

Names and variants
The original spelling for the name in Sanskrit literature is Khaśa (Sanskrit: खश) while variants of name also used are Khasa (खस), Khaṣa (खष) and Khaśīra (खशीर).

Indian sources

Pre-historic literature

As per the research conducted by political scientist Sudama Misra, the Khasa Janapada was a late Janapada (around 1100-500 BCE) under the broad division of Parvata-shrayin Āryāvarta (Himalayan Āryāvarta) of the ancient Indian Iron Age. 

The Manusmṛiti mentions the Khaśa as Kṣatriya-s formerly, due to omission of the sacred-rites and neglect of Brāhmaṇā-s.

शनकैस्तु क्रियालोपादिमाः क्षत्रियजातयः ।

वृषलत्वं गता लोके ब्राह्मणादर्शनेन च ॥ ४३ ॥
But by the omission of the sacred rites, and also by their neglect of Brāhmaṇas, the following Kṣatriya castes have gradually sunk to the position of the low-born.—(43)

पौण्ड्रकाश्चौड्रद्रविडाः काम्बोजा यवनाः शकाः ।

पारदापह्लवाश्चीनाः किराता दरदाः खशाः ॥ ४४ ॥
The Puṇḍrakas, the Coḍas, the Draviḍas, the Kāmbojas, the Yavanas, the Śākas, the Pāradas, the Pahlavas, the Cīnas, the Kirātas, the Daradas and the Khaśas.—(44)

The Shukraniti mentions that People born in Khasa region take the wife of their brother if she has lost her husband. By these acts they do not attract atonement or restraint.

खशजाताः प्रगृह्यन्ति भ्रातृभार्य्यामभर्तृकाम् ।
अनेन कर्मणा नैते प्रायश्चित्तदमार्हकाः ॥ ४-५-५१ ॥
Medhātithi, the 8th century CE commentator of the Manusmṛiti says "Some people might be led to think that all these races here named are found to be described as Kṣatriyas, so that they must be Kṣatriyas still. And it is with a view to preclude this idea that it is asserted that these are low-born." Therefore, the Manusmriti describes them as descendants of outcast Kshatriyas. 

The Bhagavata Purana gives a list of various outcast tribes, the Khaśas also one of them, which have recovered salvation by adopting the religion of Viṣṇu Vaishnavism. The Mahabharata mentions the Khasas as one of the northern tribes who fought on the side of the Kaurava against Satyaki. In the Karna Parva of Mahabharata, Khasas are mentioned living in the Panjab region between Āraṭṭa and Vasāti: In the Sabhaparvan of the Mahabharata, they are mentioned between Meru and Mandara along with Kulindas and Tanganas. In Dronaparvan of the Mahabharata, they are mentioned with other northwestern tribes such as Daradas, Tanganas, Lampakas and Kulindas. The Vaishnava text Harivamsa describes that the Khasas were defeated by the King Sagara. The Markandeya Purana states that the Khasa is a country against the mountain. The Markandeya Purana, Vayu Purana and Kalki Purana describes that Khasas together with Sakas and other tribes have penetrated to the northwest of India. The Skanda Purana mentions the region of Himachal Pradesh and Kumaon-Garhwal as Kedare-Khasa-Mandale.

Medieval literature

The Brihat Samhita authored by Indian polymath Varāhamihira grouped Khasas with Kulutas, Kashmiras, Tanganas, and Kunatas. The Mudrarakshasa of Indian poet Vishakhadatta mentions that Khasas and Magadhas were Ganas (troops) in the army of Rakshasa and Malayaketu. According to an ancient Kashmiri text Nilamata Purana compiled by Indian scholar Ved Kumari Ghai, the Khasa tribe occupied  This assertion is also corroborated by the later 12th century text Rajatarangini translated by British archaeologist Sir Marc Aurel Stein. The Bharata Nātyaśāstra by the Indian musicologist Bharata Muni mentions that the mother tongue language of Khaśas was Bāhliki language in the phrase  The Kavyamimamsa of Rajashekhara mentions the Kuluta king with the title Khasadhipati. The inscription of Dadda II (also known as Praśāntarāga) mentions about the Khasas in the phrase "...Yascopamiyate - sat - kataka - samunnata vidhyadharavasa taya Himachale na Khasa parivarataya." A Jain text Vasudevahindi by Sanghadasa narrates the travel of a merchant named Charudatta in the countries of Khasas, Hunas and Cinas. He further locates them at the northeastern direction of the Indus river.

European sources 
Greek Geographer Ptolemy contended that the country of Khasas (referred as 'Khasia') was located near the Trans-Himalayan range of Northwest India. Roman Geographer Pliny noted that  E.T. Atkinson speculated that Pliny referred the terms, Cesi and Catriboni on the above quotations to Khasa and Kshatriya. Irish linguist Sir George Abraham Grierson in his work Linguistic Survey of India (Volume 9 Part 4) mentions the remarks by the Roman Geographer Pliny on the Khasa (referred as 'Casiri') tribe with the imputations of cannabalism. Pliny further stated them as "an Indian people":
 
Indian sociologist R.N. Saksena explains that this imputation was due to the existing suspicion towards Khasas by the Vedic Aryans, though he regards them as the earlier wave of the same 'Aryan settler' group.

Tibetan sources 
The Mongolian-Tibetan historian Sumpa Yeshe Peljor (writing in the 18th century) lists the Khasas alongside other peoples found in Central Asia since antiquity, including the Yavanas (Greeks), Kambojas, Tukharas, Hunas and Daradas.

Modern sources
Irish Linguist George Abraham Grierson quoted that the Khasas that Pliny wrote about were one of the warrior "Kshatriya tribe of Aryan origin" with linguistic connections to both Sanskrit and Iranian languages, who lost claim to Vedichood due to non-observance of Vedic rules: 
 According to E.T. Atkinson, the Jaunsar-Bawar is the representative Khasiya tract and it

Descendants 
Irish linguist Sir G.A. Grierson asserted that "..the great mass of the Aryan speaking population of the lower Himalaya from Kashmir to Darjeeling is inhabited by tribes descended from the ancient Khasas of Mahabharata." The Khasa peoples are the Khakhas of Jhelum Valley, the Kanets of Kangra and Garhwal, Khasa of Jaunsar-Bawar and the bulk population of Garhwal and Kumaon referred as "Khasia".

Khasas under Katyuris

The Katyuris were of the Khasha origin as agreed by most scholars. They belonged to the Khasha people that entirely dominated the inner Himalayan belt upto Nepal and they extensively populated the mountainous regions of Uttarakhand. Previously, Khashas had strongly established themselves from Afghanistan to Nepal from ancient period and as per internal evidences, they managed the village level theocratic republics like Gram-Rajya and Mandals under various local clans and identities. Katyuri was one of the ruling houses of Joshimath that claimed the sovereignty over other Gram Rajyas of the entire territory. The Katyuris ruled from Joshimath in the Alaknanda Valley and later they shifted their capital to Baijnath.

Khasas under Malla rule

Khasas are thought to be connected to the medieval Khasa Malla kingdom and the modern Khas people of Nepal. The modern Khas people of Nepal have also been connected with the ancient Khasas, although their period of migration in Nepal remains ambiguous. In Nepal the Khas people first settled around present day Humla and Jumla. The Khasa kings of Nepal formed the famous Malla Kingdom, which ruled Humla from the eleventh century before collapsing and splintering into local chiefdoms during the fourteenth century. The Khasas (identified with Khasa Mallas) are also mentioned in several Indian inscriptions dated between 8th and 13th centuries CE. The 954 AD Khajuraho Inscription of Dhaṇga states Khasa kingdom equivalent to Gauda of Bengal and Gurjara-Pratihara dynasty. The Nalanda inscription of Devapala and Bhagalpur; copper plate of Narayanapala also mentions about Khasas. The three copper plates from Pandukeshavara explains the territories of Khasas.

Khasas of Kashmir

The 12th-century text Rajatarangini translated by British archaeologist Sir Marc Aurel Stein links the Khasas with northwestern affiliations. It describes at  Rajatarangini describes the rulers of Rajapuri (modern Rajauri) as the "lord of the Khasas". It also describes the chiefs of the Lohara as Khasas. The Khasa chiefs of Rajapuri freely intermarried with Kshatriya rulers of Kashmir while the Khasa chief of Lohara, Simharaja, married a daughter of Shahi Kings of Kabul. The descendants of the royal family of Rajauri later became Muslim Rajput chiefs and they retained the rulership of the territory till 19th century. Stein also identified the modern Khakhas as descendants of Khasas mentioned in the Rajatarangini. The Bomba clan are descended from the medieval Khas people of Kashmir that inhabited the entire Karnah region of Kashmir.

See also
Kingdoms of Ancient India
List of ancient Indo-Aryan peoples and tribes
Kuru Kingdom
Uttarakuru
Kambojas
Gandharas
Daradas
Kashmiras
Madra
Sakas, ancient Scythians mentioned in Sanskrit literatures

References

Footnotes

Notes

Books

 
 

 
 
 

 

 

Himalayan peoples
Ancient peoples of India
Ancient peoples of Pakistan
Ancient peoples of Nepal
Ancient India
Ancient Nepal
Ethnic groups in India
Ethnic groups in Nepal
Iron Age countries in Asia
Iron Age cultures of South Asia
Indo-Aryan peoples
Mahabharata
Locations in Hindu mythology
History of Kashmir
History of Himachal Pradesh
History of Uttarakhand
History of Nepal
Dynasties of India
Dynasties of Nepal